Eagle is a black-and-white indie comic book series which originated in 1986 by artists Neil Vokes and Rich Rankin. Most issues were written by Jack Herman, although some were written by Herman, Vokes and Rankin. It was originally published by its creators as Crystal Comics (Crystal Publications), then by Apple Comics. Initially the Eagle series ran for 23 issues, ending in 1989; the last 7 issues were published by Apple Comics. The series achieved a cult following. It was revived in 2016 by publisher American Mythology Productions and again features art by Vokes and writing by Herman.

Summary
Eagle chronicled the adventures of detective and vigilante Richard Eagle, a mystic and martial arts adept who wields a sword. Eagle resides in Crystal City on a futuristic Earth, inhabited by humans and non-humans (presumably extraterrestrials).

Notes

1986 comics debuts
1989 comics endings
2016 comics debuts
Adventure comics
American comics characters
American comics
Detective comics
Fictional detectives
Fictional male martial artists
Comic martial artists
Fictional swordfighters in comics
Martial arts comics
Science fiction comics